Satanás is a novel by the Colombian writer Mario Mendoza Zambrano published in 2002. It is about three stories happening around a real event on December 4, 1986: Campo Elías Delgado, a Vietnam War veteran, killed his apartment building neighbors, a student of him and her mother, his own mother, and 30 people in a high-end restaurant before committing suicide. The novel narrates his life and that of three of his victims.

It received the 2002 Premio Biblioteca Breve as best unpublished novel.

It was inspiration for the movie of the same name produced in 2007.

References

2002 Colombian novels
Fiction set in 1986
Novels set in Colombia
Colombian novels adapted into films